Loreo is a comune (municipality) in the Province of Rovigo in the Italian region Veneto, located about  south of Venice and about  east of Rovigo.

The municipality of Loreo contains the frazioni (subdivisions, mainly villages and hamlets) Ca'Negra, Canalvecchio, Cavanella Po, Pilastro, Retinella, Sostegno, and Tornova.

Loreo borders the following municipalities: Adria, Cavarzere, Chioggia, Porto Viro, Rosolina, Taglio di Po.

Demographic evolution

References

External links 

Cities and towns in Veneto